The Triangle School is a property in Fairview, Tennessee that was listed on the National Register of Historic Places in 2007.  It has also been known as New Union Valley School.

It was built in 1938 and includes Colonial Revival architecture.

The NRHP eligibility of the property was addressed in a 1988 study of Williamson County historical resources.

References

School buildings on the National Register of Historic Places in Tennessee
Buildings and structures in Williamson County, Tennessee
Colonial Revival architecture in Tennessee
School buildings completed in 1938
Schools in Tennessee
National Register of Historic Places in Williamson County, Tennessee
1938 establishments in Tennessee